USS Growler has been the name of more than one United States Navy ship, and may refer to:

, schooner acquired in 1812, captured by the British in 1813, recaptured by the United States in 1813, and finally captured by the British again in 1814
, a sloop acquired in 1812 that the British captured in 1813 and renamed HMS Chubb. The United States recaptured her in 1814 and sold her in 1815.
, a submarine commissioned in 1942 and sunk in 1944
, a cruise missile submarine in commission from 1958 to 1964

United States Navy ship names